Box Drawing is a Unicode block containing characters for compatibility with legacy graphics standards that contained characters for making bordered charts and tables, i.e. box-drawing characters. Its block name in Unicode 1.0 was Form and Chart Components.

Block

See also 
 Dingbat
 Block Elements (Unicode block)
 Geometric Shapes (Unicode block)
 Symbols for Legacy Computing
 Box-drawing character
 Code page 437
 Semigraphics (or pseudographics)

References 

Unicode blocks